KEZK-FM (102.5 MHz) is a commercial radio station licensed to St. Louis, Missouri.  It broadcasts an adult contemporary radio format and is owned by Audacy, Inc.  From mid-November through the Christmas holiday, KEZK switches to an all-Christmas music format. The studios and offices are on Olive Street in Downtown St. Louis.

KEZK has an effective radiated power (ERP) of 100,000 watts, the maximum for non-grandfathered FM stations, covering parts of Missouri and Illinois.  The transmitter is in Resurrection Cemetery in Shrewsbury.  KEZK broadcasts using the HD radio hybrid format.  The HD2 digital subchannel simulcasts News/Talk sister station KMOX (1120 AM).  The HD3 subchannel airs "Channel Q," Audacy's Talk/EDM service for the LGBTQ community.

History

KDNA and easy listening
The 102.5 frequency in St. Louis had originally been the home of listener-supported free form KDNA from 1969 to 1972.  KDNA was a non-commercial station, supported by listener donations, yet it broadcast on a commercial frequency.  In 1972, it relocated to the non-commercial part of the FM dial, and now is KDHX at 88.1 MHz.

Heftel Broadcasting paid for the frequency, and in June 1973, it put KEZK on the air.  KEZK carried a beautiful music format and its call sign reflected that format with the EZ call letters, referring to easy listening.  It was among St. Louis' highest rated FM stations in the 1970s and 1980s. By the mid-1980s, however, listeners interested in the beautiful music format were beginning to age and most advertisers seek a younger audience. In response, KEZK began adding more vocals to its mostly instrumental playlist.

Soft AC
On January 1, 1991, KEZK completed the transition to a soft adult contemporary format, playing music mostly from the 1970s and 1980s as well as some current soft hits.  Through the early 2000s, KEZK moved to a mainstream adult contemporary music format.

Jeff Kapugi became KEZK's Program Director in November 2010, replacing Mark Edwards.  The current program director is Cat Thomas.

Fresh 102.5

On December 27, 2010, the station rebranded from "Soft Rock 102.5 KEZK" to "Fresh 102.5" adopting the brand used on sister CBS Radio stations WWFS New York, WCFS-FM Chicago and WIAD Washington, D.C.

However, while those three stations had playlists more closely resembling hot adult contemporary stations, KEZK continued to feature 1970s artists such as Billy Joel and Chicago.  The name "Fresh" was more of a rebranding than a format change, as sister station KYKY already features a Hot AC format.

Today's Hits & Yesterday's Favorites
On May 26, 2015, at 7:05 a.m., after stunting the prior weekend with 1980s music (ending with "Kokomo" by The Beach Boys), KEZK dropped the "Fresh" handle, rebranding as "102.5 KEZK, Today's Hits and Yesterday's Favorites."   The first song after the relaunch was "P.Y.T." by Michael Jackson. While many AC stations have moved more contemporary, KEZK continues to play artists from the 1980s, such Michael Jackson, Madonna, Billy Joel and Hall & Oates.

After the annual Christmas music programing concluded at the end of 2020, while using the slogan "All Your Favorites From the 80s and Today," the station shifted to a playlist with little to no recurrent music, and heavy emphasis on the 1980s and to a lesser extent, the 2000s. KEZK also plays songs from the 1970s, 1990s, and 2010s. 

On February 2, 2017, CBS Radio announced it would merge with Entercom. The merger was approved on November 9, 2017, and was consummated on the 17th.

Christmas music
KEZK has been “St. Louis’ Official Christmas Station” since 2003. They switch to Christmas music during the second week of November, and air Christmas music until December 25, when the station usually plays 36 hours of commercial-free Christmas music from noon on Christmas Eve until midnight on December 26. KEZK also played Christmas music in late March until early April 2020 during the first few weeks of the COVID-19 pandemic quarantines, calling it “Christmas In March”.

Programming
Since 2003, KEZK has been the St. Louis affiliate for John Tesh, which runs Sunday nights from 9 p.m. to Midnight (formerly Sundays 7 a.m.-10 a.m.). The station carried the Deliah show until 2012 and briefly during the 2020-21 season.

Awards
In 2007, the station was nominated for the top 25 markets Adult Contemporary station of the year award by Radio & Records magazine. Other nominees included WMJX in Boston, KOST in Los Angeles; WALK-FM in Nassau, New York; WLTW in New York City; and WBEB in Philadelphia.

References

External links 
 
 

EZK-FM
Radio stations established in 1972
Audacy, Inc. radio stations
Mainstream adult contemporary radio stations in the United States
1972 establishments in Missouri